Lucia Žitňanská (born 3 June 1964) is a Slovak politician and member of Most–Híd. She served as Minister of Justice in the third government of Robert Fico from 2016–2018. In 2006 she served as deputy prime minister and Minister of Justice of Slovakia and in 2010 until 2012 she again served as Minister of Justice in the cabinet of Iveta Radičová.

She is married and has three children.

References

External link

|-

|-

1964 births
Justice ministers of Slovakia
Living people
Members of the National Council (Slovakia) 2006-2010
Politicians from Bratislava
21st-century Slovak politicians
21st-century Slovak women politicians
Most–Híd politicians
Women government ministers of Slovakia

Female justice ministers
Members of the National Council (Slovakia) 2012-2016
Female members of the National Council (Slovakia)